Johnny Yong Bosch (born January 6, 1976) is an American actor, musician, singer, and martial artist. His first major role was the portrayal of Adam Park, the second on screen Black Power Ranger and later, the Green Zeo Ranger and first Green Turbo Ranger in the Power Rangers franchise, which led to roles in some martial arts television and feature films. Bosch is located in Los Angeles and does most of his voice-over work at Bang Zoom! Entertainment, Animaze, New Generation Pictures, NYAV Post, Studiopolis and on some occasions travels to Dallas to record shows for Funimation. As a voice actor, some of his most notable roles were Vash the Stampede in Trigun, Ichigo Kurosaki in Bleach, and Lelouch Vi Britannia in Code Geass.

Life and career
Bosch was born in Kansas City, Missouri and raised in Garland, Texas, as John Jay Bosch. His father was a soldier in the Army and met his mother while stationed in South Korea. He was interested in martial arts at an early age, inspired by martial arts movies and Bruce Lee. He taught himself martial arts at first, mimicking moves from Lee as well as Jackie Chan. Bosch said he was ridiculed a lot when he was young and became a bully, but made a change for the better after studying kung fu. In addition to training in martial arts, in which he won several competitions, he also played soccer.

Power Rangers and others projects
Bosch auditioned for the Power Rangers show in Dallas after being informed of the audition by his martial arts instructor. In 1994, he landed the role of Adam Park, the new Black Power Ranger, replacing Walter Emanuel Jones in the second season of Mighty Morphin Power Rangers. Bosch said that when he got the part, he changed his middle name to Yong, which was part of his mother's given name, at the request of Saban who thought his credited name needed to be more Asian. For the feature film Power Rangers: The Movie, he did all of his stunts after his stuntman had broken his leg. He also noted that among all the different animal characters the Rangers got to be associated, his was associated to a frog. In Power Rangers Zeo, Bosch's character became a Green Ranger. His final regular stint in the franchise was in Power Rangers Turbo, where his character passes his Green Turbo Ranger powers to a new member. He played Adam in the second feature film Turbo: A Power Rangers Movie. In looking back at his acting for the show, Bosch said that "Power Rangers was a lot of fun but it was a kid's show and very cheesy because of it, which made getting work after that really hard. Plus, I didn't know squat about acting then." His best friends on the set included Jason David Frank (who played Tommy Oliver), Jason Narvy (who played Skull) and Nakia Burrise (who played Tanya Sloan). At the request of Power Rangers director Koichi Sakamoto, he had a guest appearance in the Power Rangers Operation Overdrive episode "Once A Ranger" in 2007 for the franchise's 15th anniversary, where he mentioned he got to go to New Zealand. He and Narvy also starred in the film Wicked Game, also known as Extreme Heist, which was directed by Sakamoto and features several other Power Rangers alumni.

In July 2019, a crowdfunding campaign for the film Legend Of The White Dragon, including Jason David Frank, Bosch, Jason Faunt, Ciara Hanna, Yoshi Sudarso, Chrysti Ane and Jenna Frank, was launched on kickstarter.

In 2020, he directed his first film Ark Exitus starring Jason Narvy.

Voice acting
Bosch made his voice acting debut as main character Kaneda from the cult classic anime film Akira. In 2001, His other most famous voice over role was the main character of Vash the Stampede in the title show Trigun, he worked once again with Koichi Sakamoto on the film Broken Path. In the same year, Bosch was also cast as the lead role of Ichigo Kurosaki in the hit shonen anime Bleach. In 2007, Bosch co-starred alongside Ray Park in a comic-book style action film, Hellbinders. Among other works, Bosch also voiced Lelouch in Code Geass in 2008, and Izaya Orihara in Durarara in 2011. Johnny voiced Yun Arikawa in the 2021 Netflix kaiju anime series, Godzilla Singular Point.

In video games, Bosch has voiced Firion, the protagonist of Final Fantasy II, in the crossover games Dissidia: Final Fantasy and Dissidia 012 Final Fantasy. In 2011, he voiced Yang in Super Street Fighter IV Arcade Edition, Tohru Adachi and the protagonist Yu Narukami in the Persona 4 games and its anime adaptation. In 2014, Bosch also voiced main character Hajime Hinata from Danganronpa 2: Goodbye Despair. In 2015, he voiced Kung Jin in Mortal Kombat X. Among video games, Bosch liked voicing Nero in Devil May Cry 4 as he got to travel to Japan to do the motion capture. He reprise his role of voicing Nero in its following Devil May Cry 5. In the same year, Bosch landed the role of Artemis in Viz Media's redub of Sailor Moon as well as Sailor Moon Crystal. Bosch also voiced lead character Nate Adams from Yo-kai Watch which has aired on Disney XD in the US.

On July 4, 2017, he voiced Broccoli Punch in Cartoon Network's Mighty Magiswords, recording with fellow Power Rangers actor Paul Schrier. He reprised his role as Broccoli Punch, as well as playing the Giant Monster and Whiney, in the second season two-part episode "The Incredible Tiny Warriors".

In 2019, Bosch replaced Vic Mignogna as the voice of Broly and Sabo for the Funimation dub of the Dragon Ball and One Piece franchises respectively, due to the sexual harassment allegations against Mignogna.

Music

Bosch got involved in music by teaching himself how to play guitar. In his band Eyeshine, he provides vocals, songwriting, and guitar. He describes the type of music he plays as "Edge Rock. We're somewhere on the edge of sounding like grunge, alt. rock, punk and pop." His musical inspirations include The Beatles, Foo Fighters, Nirvana, Oasis, Led Zeppelin and also movie soundtracks.

The band released an instrumental album called Sonosis. Bosch described the album as "something you could just listen to and could move you to feel something" and that "the titles were a reflection of the emotions we felt as we wrote the songs".

The band gave their final performance at Yama-Con in December 2017.

In 2018, Johnny formed a new band with former Eyeshine guitarist Masataka "Polo" Yazaki called Where Giants Fall. They released their first self-titled studio album on November 25, 2021.

Personal life
Bosch was born to a Korean mother and an American father of Irish and German descent. He is the second of four children in his family. He married Amy Bosch on March 21, 2003. He has a daughter named Novi and a son named Jetson.

Filmography

Voice over roles

Anime

Film

Animation

Video games

Dubbing of foreign shows in English

Live-action roles

Discography
 Studio albums
 Red Stripes White Lights (2008)
 My Paper Kingdom (2009)
 Tone of Echoes (2010)
 Sonosis (2011)
 Revolution Airwaves (2012)
 Fall Seven Times, Stand Up Eight (2013)
 Sidewalk Dreams and Chalk Dust (2015)
 Gone Tomorrow (2017)
 Where Giants Fall (2021)

 EPs
 How About That (2006)
 I'm Dreaming On (2015)

 Compilation albums
 Afterglow (2011)
 Xmas (2011)
 Sansvox (2011) – karaoke album
 Like Yesterday (2012)
 Sansvox II: Acoustic (2014) – karaoke album

References

External links

 
 
 
 
 

1976 births
Living people
American male actors of Korean descent
American male film actors
American male television actors
American male video game actors
American male voice actors
American musicians of Korean descent
American people of German descent
American people of Irish descent
American people of South Korean descent
Male actors from Kansas City, Missouri
Male actors from Los Angeles
People from Garland, Texas
20th-century American male actors
21st-century American male actors